Hurricane Smith (also known as Dead on Delivery) is a 1992 Australian action film directed by Colin Budds and starring Carl Weathers as an American oil field worker named Billy 'Hurricane' Smith who travels to Australia on a quest to rescue his sister, where he gets mixed up with drug smugglers.

Cast
Carl Weathers as Billy "Hurricane" Smith
Jürgen Prochnow as Charlie Dowd
Cassandra Delaney as Julie
Tony Bonner as Howard Fenton
David Argue as Shanks
John Ewart as David Griffiths
Louise McDonald as Annabel
Suzie MacKenzie as Rochelle
Karen Hall as Francie
Johnny Raaen as Arkie Davis

Production

The film was shot in May 1990.

Box office

Hurricane Smith grossed $89,467 at the box office in Australia.

See also
Cinema of Australia

References

External links
 
 
Hurricane Smith at Oz Movies

1992 films
Village Roadshow Pictures films
Australian action drama films
1990s action drama films
Films scored by Brian May (composer)
Films shot in Queensland
Warner Bros. films
1992 drama films
Films directed by Colin Budds
1990s English-language films